A birthday is an annual celebration of the date on which a person was born.

Birthday(s), The Birthday, or B-day may also refer to:

Film and television
 Birthday (1977 film), an Azerbaijani film
 Birthday (2019 film), a South Korean film

Television episodes
 "Birth Day" (The Handmaid's Tale)
 "Birthday" (Angel)
 "Birthday" (Care Bears)
 "Birthday" (New Girl)
 "The Birthday" (Dynasty 1984)
 "The Birthday" (Dynasty 1987)
 "The Birthday" (Joe 90)
 "The Birthday" (The Vampire Diaries)

Literature
 The Birthday (play), a 1941 verse drama by Paul Goodman
 The Birthday (short story collection) , a 1999 collection of Japanese-language Ring-series stories by Koji Suzuki
 "A Birthday", a 1995 science fiction short story by Esther Friesner
 The Birth-day, an 1836 autobiographical poem by Caroline Bowles Southey

Music
 The Birthday (band), a Japanese garage rock band

Albums
 Birthday (The Association album), 1968
 Birthday (ClariS album), 2012
 Birthday (Gentouki album), 2016
 Birthday (The Peddlers album), 1969
 Birthday (The Crüxshadows EP) or the title song, 2007
 Birthday, an EP by Infected Mushroom, 2002
 Birthdays (album), by Keaton Henson, 2013
 B'Day, by Beyoncé, 2006
 B-Day, by Tankard, 2002
 Birth Day, by New Birth, 1972

Songs
 "Birthday" (Anne-Marie song), 2020
 "Birthday" (Beatles song), 1968
 "Birthday" (Disclosure, Kehlani and Syd song), 2020
 "Birthday" (Jeon Somi song), 2019
 "Birthday" (K. Michelle song), 2017
 "Birthday" (Katy Perry song), 2014
 "Birthday" (Namie Amuro song), 2014
 "Birthday" (Red Velvet song), 2022
 "Birthday" (Selena Gomez song), 2013
 "Birthday" (The Sugarcubes song), 1987
 "Birthday" (Taproot song), 2005
 "Birthday" (Will.i.am song), 2014
 "Birthday", by Fetty Wap and Monty, 2019
 "Birthday", by Blur from Leisure, 1991
 "Birthday", by Meredith Brooks from Blurring the Edges, 1997
 "Birthday", by Destiny's Child from Destiny's Child, 1998
 "Birthday", by Flo Rida, 2007
 "Birthday", by JP Cooper from Fifty Shades Darker: Original Motion Picture Soundtrack, 2017
 "Birthday", by Junior Boys, 2003
 "Birthday", by Migos from Culture III, 2021
 "Birthday", by Peakboy from 05/27, 2018
 "Birthday", by the Prom Kings, 2005
 "Birthday", by Twista from Category F5, 2009
 "Birthday", by Usher and Zaytoven from A, 2018
 "Birthdays", by The Smith Street Band from More Scared of You Than You Are of Me, 2017
 "Birth-day (Love Made Real)", by Suzanne Vega from Nine Objects of Desire, 1996
 "Birthday Song", by Helen Reddy from No Way to Treat a Lady, 1975
 "B-Day", by IKon from New Kids: Begin, 2017
 "B-Day Song", by Madonna from the deluxe edition of MDNA, 2012

Other uses
 Birthday (company), a Japanese video game developer
 Birthdays (retailer), a defunct British greeting cards retailer
 Birthday (patience), a solitaire card game
 The Birthday, a 1915 painting by Marc Chagall

See also
 Birthday Party (disambiguation)
 Birthday Song (disambiguation)
 
 
 Happy Birthday (disambiguation)
 It's My Birthday (disambiguation)